The 1991 Indiana Hoosiers football team represented Indiana University Bloomington as a member of the Big Ten Conference during the 1991 NCAA Division I-A football season. Led by eighth-year head coach Bill Mallory, the Hoosiers compiled an overall record of 7–4–1 with a mark of 5–3 in conference play, tying for third place the Big Ten. Indiana was invited to the Copper Bowl, where they beat Baylor, 24–0. The team played home games at Memorial Stadium in Bloomington, Indiana. 

Vaughn Dunbar set the school record for rushing yards in a single season with 1,805 yards. This record stood until the 2014 season when it was broken by Tevin Coleman with 2,036 yards.

Schedule

Roster

Game summaries

at Notre Dame

at Iowa

Purdue

vs. Baylor (Copper Bowl)

1992 NFL draftees

Awards and honors
 Vaughn Dunbar, first-team All-American
 Vaughn Dunbar, finished sixth in Heisman Trophy voting
 Vaughn Dunbar, ranked second in the nation in rushing yards per game

References

Indiana
Indiana Hoosiers football seasons
Guaranteed Rate Bowl champion seasons
Indiana Hoosiers football